Helmut Oehring (born 1961) is a German composer. He was born in East-Berlin, the son of deaf-mute parents. After training as a construction worker, Oehring worked as a cemetery gardener, forest worker, geriatric nurse and stoker. He is self-taught as guitarist and composer. From 1990 to 1992, Oehring studied with Friedrich Goldmann and Georg Katzer at the Academy of Arts, Berlin. He was a fellow of Villa Massimo in 1994/1995. Oering is honorary professor for Théatre musical at the University of the Arts Bern.

Awards
 Hanns Eisler Prize (1990)
 Prize at the Young Composers Forum, WDR (1992)
 Scholarship of Lower Saxony (1993/94)
 Scholarship of the Villa Massimo (1994/95)
 Scholarship from the Cité des Arts (1994)
 Hindemith Prize of the Schleswig-Holstein Musik Festival (1997)
 Schneider-Schott Music Prize (1998)
 Arnold Schönberg Prize (2008)
 German Music Authors' Prize in the music theater category (2015)
 Brandenburg Art Prize for Music/Composition (2016)

Memberships
 2005 Academy of Arts, Berlin
 2013 Sächsische Akademie der Künste

Works
  350 musical works of all genres

Autobiography

References

Further reading

External links 
 
 Helmut Oehring: Biography
 Wayback Machine
 Helmut Oehring in Profile on JSTOR
 Kurt Weill Festival – Artist in Residence 2011

1961 births
German male composers
German composers
Living people
Pupils of Friedrich Goldmann
Members of the Academy of Arts, Berlin